Clypeoporthella is a genus of fungi in the family Diaporthaceae.

References

External links

Sordariomycetes genera
Diaporthales